The Figure Reasoning Test (FRT) is an intelligence test created by John Clifford Daniels in the late 1940s.

It is used by a few Mensa chapters in Europe for their admissions tests. For example, Mensa Norway provides an online test which resembles the format of the Figure Reasoning Test.

References

External links 
 Product website at Hogrefe (German).

Intelligence tests